Gorgar is a 1979 pinball machine designed by Barry Oursler and released by Williams Electronics. It was the first speech-synthesized ("talking") pinball machine, containing a vocabulary of seven words ("Gorgar", "speaks", "beat", "you", "me", "hurt", "got") that were combined to form varying broken-English phrases, such as "Gorgar speaks" and "Me got you". The pinball machine also has a heartbeat sound effect that increases in speed during longer gameplay.

Digital versions
Gorgar was available on FarSight Studios' 2012 release The Pinball Arcade for multiple platforms until June 29, 2018, when the license for inclusion of Williams and Bally tables in the game expired. The table is included in the  Pinball Hall of Fame: The Williams Collection. Unauthorized reproductions of this table are available for Visual Pinball.

In popular culture
The machine appears in the 5th episode of the 2nd season of Highway to Heaven, appropriately an episode in which the Devil himself appeared. 
German power metal band Helloween's 1985 album Walls of Jericho included a track titled "Gorgar" that symbolized the machine as a form of gambling addiction.

References

1979 pinball machines
Williams pinball machines